Ímar (died c. 873), who may be synonymous with Ivar the Boneless, was a Viking leader in Ireland and Scotland in the mid-late ninth century who founded the Uí Ímair dynasty, and whose descendants would go on to dominate the Irish Sea region for several centuries. He was the son of the king of Lochlann, identified in the non-contemporary Fragmentary Annals of Ireland as Gofraid. The Fragmentary Annals name Auisle and Amlaíb Conung as his brothers. Another Viking leader, Halfdan Ragnarsson, is considered by some scholars to be another brother. The Irish Annals title Amlaíb, Ímar and Auisle "kings of the foreigners". Modern scholars use the title "Kings of Dublin" after the Viking settlement which formed the base of their power. Some scholars consider Ímar to be identical to Ivar the Boneless, a Viking commander of the Great Heathen Army named in contemporary English sources who also appears in the Icelandic sagas as the eldest son of the legendary Viking Ragnar Lodbrok by third wife Aslaug.

During the late 850s and early 860s Ímar was involved in a protracted conflict with Máel Sechnaill, overking of the Southern Uí Néill and the most powerful ruler in Ireland. The cause of the conflict is uncertain, but it may have been sparked by competition for control of Munster and its resources. Ímar allied successively with Cerball, King of Osraige and Áed Findliath, overking of the Northern Uí Néill against Máel Sechnaill. Máel Sechnaill died in 862 and his lands were split, effectively ending the conflict. Following this Ímar and his kin warred with several Irish leaders in an attempt to expand their kingdom's influence. Ímar disappears from the historical record in Ireland between the years 864 and 870; this is consistent with Ímar being identical to Ivar the Boneless - Ivar was active in England between these two dates and he is not mentioned by English sources after 870. In 870 the annals record that Dumbarton Rock, the chief fortress of the kingdom of Strathclyde, was successfully captured by Ímar and Amlaíb following a four-month-long siege.

Ímar died in 873 and is given the title "King of the Norsemen of all Ireland and Britain" in contemporary annals. The Fragmentary Annals record that Ímar's father also died that year, and it is believed that at that time their combined territory encompassed Dublin, the Isle of Man, the Western Isles, Orkney, and large parts of the northern and western Scottish coast including Argyll, Caithness and Sutherland.

Background
Norse contact with Scotland predates the first written records in the 8th century, although the nature and frequency of these contacts is unknown. Excavations on the island of Unst in Shetland indicate that Scandinavian settlers had reached there perhaps as early as the mid-7th century and from 793 onwards repeated raids by Vikings on the British Isles are recorded. "All the islands of Britain" were devastated in 794 with Iona being sacked in 802 and 806. The Frankish  may record the conquest of the Inner Hebrides by Vikings in 847. Scholarly interpretations of the period "have led to widely divergent reconstructions of Viking Age Scotland", especially in the early period, and Barrett has identified several competing theories, none of which he regards as proven. Donnchadh Ó Corráin notes: "when and how the Vikings conquered and occupied the Isles is unknown, perhaps unknowable".

The earliest recorded Viking raids in Ireland occurred in 795. Over time, these raids increased in intensity, and they overwintered in Ireland for the first time in 840–841. Longphorts were also established at other sites around Ireland, some of which developed into larger Viking settlements over time. The Viking population in Ireland was boosted in 851 with the arrival of a large group known as "dark foreigners" – a contentious term used to refer to the newly arrived Vikings, as opposed to the "fair foreigners", i.e., the Viking population which was resident prior to this influx. A kingdom in Viking Scotland was established by the mid ninth-century, and it exerted control over some of the Vikings in Ireland. By 853 a separate kingdom of Dublin had been set up which claimed control over all the Vikings in Ireland.

The main historical sources for this period are the Norse sagas and the Irish annals. Some of the annals, such as the Annals of Ulster, are believed to be contemporary accounts, whereas the sagas were written down at dates much later than the events they describe and are considered far less reliable. A few of the annals, such as the Fragmentary Annals of Ireland and the Annals of the Four Masters, were also compiled at later dates, in part from more contemporary material and in part from fragments of sagas. According to Downham, "apart from these additions [of saga fragments], Irish chronicles are considered by scholars to be largely accurate records, albeit partisan in their presentation of events".

Biography

Arrival in Ireland
Ímar is first mentioned in contemporary Irish annals in 857, four years after his brother Amlaíb Conung is recorded as arriving in Ireland. The later Fragmentary Annals of Ireland suggest Ímar may have come to Ireland shortly after his brother:

Ímar and Amlaíb were joined in Ireland by another brother, Auisle, sometime before 863. From this date onwards the three brothers are described as "kings of the foreigners" by the annals, but in modern texts they are usually labelled as kings of Dublin, after the Viking settlement which was the base of their power. Lochlann, originally Laithlinn or Lothlend, the land where Ímar's father was king, is often identified with Norway, but it is not universally accepted that it had such a meaning in early times. Several historians have proposed instead that in early times, and certainly as late as the Battle of Clontarf in 1014, Lochlann refers to the Norse and Norse-Gael lands in the Hebrides, the Isle of Man, the Northern Isles and parts of mainland Scotland. Whatever the original sense, by the twelfth century, when Magnus Barefoot undertook his expedition to the West, it had come to mean Norway.

War with Máel Sechnaill
The first mention of Ímar in Irish annals in 857 concerns a war fought between Ímar and Amlaíb Conung against Máel Sechnaill, overking of the Southern Uí Néill, and a group of Vikings sometimes known as the Norse-Irish. Máel Sechnaill was the most powerful king in Ireland at the time and his lands lay close to the Viking settlement of Dublin. The fighting began in the previous year: "Great warfare between the heathens and Mael Sechnaill, supported by Norse-Irish" is reported by the Annals of Ulster.

The fighting was focused on Munster; Máel Sechnaill sought to increase his influence over the kings there. He took hostages from the province in 854, 856 and 858, and the power of the over-kings had been weakened in 856 by a Viking raid on the royal centre at Lough Cend, when Gormán son of Lonán, a relative of Munster's over-king, was killed alongside a great many others. This weakness likely drew the gaze of both Máel Sechnaill and the Vikings, and their competition for Munster's resources may have been the cause of the war. Early battles seem to have gone the way of the Vikings: Ímar and Amlaíb "inflicted a rout on Caitill the Fair and his Norse-Irish in the lands of Munster". Although there is no certain evidence to suggest that this Caitill is the same person as the Ketill Flatnose of later sagas, Anderson and Crawford have suggested that they are the same person.

In 858 Ímar, allied with Cerball, King of Ossory, routed a force of Norse-Irish at Araid Tíre (east of Lough Derg and the Shannon in modern-day County Tipperary). Ossory was a small kingdom wedged between the larger realms of Munster and Leinster. At the beginning of his reign in the 840s, Cerball's allegiance was pledged to the over-king of Munster, but as that kingdom grew weaker Ossory's strategic location allowed opportunities for his advancement. Cerball had previously fought against the Vikings, but he allied with them to challenge the supremacy of Máel Sechnaill and his Norse-Irish allies. The following year Amlaíb, Ímar and Cerball conducted a raid on Máel Sechnaill's heartlands in Meath, and in consequence a royal conference was held at Rathugh (modern-day County Westmeath). Following this meeting Cerball shed his allegiance to the Vikings and formally submitted to Máel Sechnaill in order to "make peace and amity between the men of Ireland".

With their ally turned against them, Ímar and Amlaíb sought a new alliance with Áed Findliath, overking of the Northern Uí Néill, and rival of Máel Sechnaill. In 860 Máel Sechnaill and Cerball led a large army of men from Munster, Leinster, Connacht and the Southern Uí Néill into the lands of Áed Findliath near Armagh. While the southern forces were encamped there, Áed launched a night attack, killing some of the southern men, but his forces took many casualties and were forced to retreat. In retaliation for this invasion Amlaíb and Áed led raids into Meath in 861 and 862, but they were driven off both times. According to the Fragmentary Annals this alliance had been cemented by a political marriage:

In later years, alliance between the Northern Uí Néill and the Vikings of Dublin became a regular occurrence: the Northern and Southern Uí Néill were frequent competitors for supremacy in Ireland, and the uneasy neighbourhood between Dublin and the Southern Uí Néill made the Vikings natural allies for the Northerners.

Later life

Máel Sechnaill died in 862, and his territory in Meath was split between two rulers, Lorcán mac Cathail and Conchobar mac Donnchada. Ímar and Amlaíb, now joined in Ireland by their younger brother Auisle, sought to make use of this change to extend their influence in the lands of the Southern Uí Néill. In 863 the three brothers raided Brega in alliance with Lorcán, and the following year Amlaíb drowned Conchobar at Clonard Abbey. Muirecán mac Diarmata, overking of the Uí Dúnchada, was killed by Vikings in 863, probably by Ímar and his kin trying to expand into Leinster.

Beginning around 864 the three brothers halted their campaigns of conquest in Ireland, and instead campaigned in Britain. Ímar disappears from the Irish Annals in 864, and does not reappear until 870. Downham concludes he is identical to Ivar the Boneless, a Viking leader who was active in England during this period as a commander of the Great Heathen Army. According to O Croinin "Ímar has been identified with Ívarr Beinlausi (the boneless), son of Ragnar Lodbrok, but the matter is controversial".

The reappearance of Ímar in Irish annals in 870 is marked by a raid undertaken by him and Amlaíb. They laid siege to Dumbarton Rock, the chief fortress of the Kingdom of Strathclyde, and captured it following a four-month siege. The pair returned to Dublin in 871 with 200 ships and they "brought with them in captivity a great prey of Angles, Britons and Picts". According to the Fragmentary Annals Amlaíb returned to Lochlann that year to aid their father in a war, leaving Ímar to rule alone (Auisle had died in 867). The Pictish Chronicle claims Amlaíb died around 874 during a protracted campaign against Constantine I in Scotland. The Fragmentary Annals record the death of 
Ímar's father, Gofraid, in 873. The final mention of Ímar in contemporary annals is also in 873 when his death is reported. In these reports he is titled "king of the Norsemen of all Ireland and Britain". According to Ó Corrain the evidence suggests that by his death Ímar's kingdom (including the territory formerly ruled by his father) included Man, the Western Isles, Argyll, Caithness, Sutherland, Orkney, and parts of the coastline of Ross and Cromarty and Inverness.

Origins

Ivar the Boneless

In 865 the Great Heathen Army landed in England and one of its leaders is identified by the Anglo-Saxon Chronicle as "Ingvar". Later Norse tradition records Ingvar under the name of Ivar the Boneless, and calls him a son of the legendary Ragnar Lodbrok. It is generally accepted that Ivar the Boneless and Ingvar are one and the same, though the epithet "the Boneless" is not recorded until the twelfth century and its origins are obscure. Moreover, some suppose Ivar the Boneless to be identical to Ímar, though there is no scholarly consensus one way or another. Woolf supports the connection between these two "Ivars" and writes of the Great Heathen Army that invaded East Anglia in 865 that "it is now generally agreed that they arrived in Britain directly from Ireland where Ívarr, the senior partner by 865, had been active for at least a decade". Ó Corrain argues that the "evidence in favour of the identification of Ímar and Inguar consists of three points: the identity of the names, the absence of any mention of Ímar in the Irish annals between 864 and the Irish account of the siege of Dumbarton in 870, and the subsequent close connections between the dynasties of Dublin and York". Forte, Oram, and Pedersen note that Ivar is not mentioned in any English source after 870, when Ímar reappears in the Irish annals.

Ó Corrain also offers argument against the identification of Ímar and Ingvar/Ivar:  "To take but one example, if Ivarr of Dublin is identical with Inguar, how are we to give any credence to Smyth's reconstruction of Brompton (p. 229) which shows Ivarr in East Anglia in 871 when we know from contemporary Irish sources that Ivarr of Dublin was besieging Dumbarton for four months in 870 and returned to Ireland in early 871 with the takings?... Taken all together, the genuine material on Inguar in contemporary English sources is slight". He also states "there is nothing new in the suggestion that Ímar of Dublin and Igwar/Ingwar/Iuuar of English history are identical. It has frequently been put forward....and has equally frequently been rejected or treated as a mere possibility". Downham concludes "while medieval writers seem to have been as interested as modern historians about Ívarr’s origins, it is perhaps wiser to accept that we do not know what these really were".

Dark and fair foreigners
The exact meaning of these terms is subject to debate, but historically the most popular interpretation has been that  refers to Danes and  refers to Norwegians.

However, the interpretation of "dark" Danes and "fair" Norwegians has recently been challenged. Dumville has suggested that  and  do not refer to any cultural difference but instead distinguish between "old" and "new" Vikings, with the group arriving with Ímar being the "new" or "dark" Vikings, and the preexisting group being the "old" or "fair" Vikings. 
Downham agrees and goes a step further, suggesting that  was applied "to followers the king of Laithlind (who had become a recurrent phenomenon for the chroniclers) as a convenient way of distinguishing them from the vikings who were already in Ireland".

Ynglings

Smyth has suggested that Amlaíb can be identified with Olaf Geirstad-Alf, King of Vestfold, who was the son of Gudrød the Hunter and half-brother of Halfdan the Black, though speculation of this nature has not received much support. Ó Corrain states that there is "no good historical or linguistic evidence to link Lothlend/Laithlind with Norway, and none to link the dynasty of Dublin to the shadowy history of the Ynglings of Vestfold".

Family
Ímar's father is identified as Gofraid by the Fragmentary Annals; an entry dated c. 871–872 gives a partial genealogy for Ímar, naming him "Ímar son of Gofraid son of Ragnall son of Gofraid Conung son of Gofraid". Ó Corrain states that this reference to Ímar's genealogical ascent is a "construct without historical value" likely with political  reasoning. Highly likely to be identical to Ivar the Boneless, his father therefore would have been Ragnar Lothbrok. Nonetheless, he accepts the possibility of Ímar's father being Gofraid (also Goffridh or Gothfraid), stating "it is likely that the father of ... Ímar (Ívarr) is Gofraid (Guðrøðr) and that he is a historical person and dynastic ancestor".

Amlaíb Conung came to Ireland first in 853, with Ímar following in or before 857, and Auisle following in or before 863. The three are identified as "kings of the foreigners" by the Annals of Ulster in 863, and as brothers by the Fragmentary Annals:

The Annals of Ulster say that Auisle was killed in 867 by "kinsmen in parricide". The Fragmentary Annals state explicitly that Amlaíb and Ímar planned their brother's death, though no motive is given. Although the three are not identified as brothers in any contemporary annals, the recurrence of their names among their descendants strongly suggests a familial connection.

Some scholars identify Halfdan Ragnarsson as another brother. This identification is contingent upon Ímar being identical to Ivar the Boneless: Halfdan and Ivar are named as brothers in the Anglo-Saxon Chronicle. According to the Annals of Ulster Amlaíb's son Oistin was slain in battle by "Albann" in 875. This figure is generally agreed to be Halfdan. If that is correct, then it may explain the reason for the conflict: it was a dynastic squabble for control of the kingdom. One potential problem is that according to Norse tradition Ivar and Halfdan were the sons of Ragnar Lodbrok, whereas Ímar and Amlaíb are named as sons of Gofraid in the Fragmentary Annals. However, the historicity of Ragnar is uncertain and the identification of Ragnar as the father of Ivar and Halfdan is not to be relied upon.

Three figures later named by the annals are identifiable as sons of Ímar. These are Bárid (d. 881), Sichfrith (d. 888), and Sitriuc (d. 896), all three of whom reigned as King of Dublin. Five individuals are titled "ua Ímair" in the annals, a term usually understood to mean "grandson of Ímar". These are Sitric Cáech, Ímar, Ragnall, Amlaíb, and Gofraid. All except for Amlaíb ruled as either King of Dublin or King of Viking Northumbria at one time or another. These five are never given a patronymic in the annals, so it is not possible to identify which of the three known sons of Ímar - if any - was their father. One possible reason for the lack of a patronym might be that they were children of a son of Ímar who never ruled Dublin, or who spent most of his time outside Ireland, thus making their legitimacy to rule dependent on the identity of their grandfather, not their father. Another possibility is that they were grandsons of Ímar through a daughter, again with their right to rule dependent on their grandfather. Another grandson, Uathmarán, is directly identifiable as the son of Bárid.

Ímar and his descendants are collectively titled the Uí Ímair - translated as "descendants of Ímar". Later members of this dynasty include multiple kings of Dublin, Northumbria and the Isles. Downham states "[Ímar's] descendants dominated the major seaports of Ireland and challenged the power of kings in Britain during the later ninth and tenth centuries". Viking power in Ireland was severely weakened by the Battle of Clontarf in 1014, and although Ímar's descendants maintained influence in and around the Irish sea region they did not have the strength they had had previously. The Crovan dynasty, rulers of Mann and the Isles, likely descended from Ímar through his great-grandson Amlaíb Cuarán. Woolf, among others, has suggested that Somerled, King of the Isles, and progenitor of Clan Donald and Clan MacDougall, descended from Ímar and the Crovan dynasty, though perhaps only through the female line.

Family tree

Notes

References

Citations

Primary sources
  Accessed via Internet Archive.
 
 
 
 
 
  Accessed via Internet Archive.

Secondary sources
 
 
 
 
  Subscription or UK public library membership required.

External links
 CELT: Corpus of Electronic Texts at University College Cork. The Corpus of Electronic Texts includes the Annals of Ulster and the Four Masters, the Chronicon Scotorum and the Book of Leinster as well as Genealogies, and various Saints' Lives. Most are translated into English, or translations are in progress.

9th century in Scotland
9th-century Irish monarchs
9th-century rulers of the Kingdom of the Isles
Rulers of Lochlann
Uí Ímair
870s deaths
Year of death uncertain
Year of birth unknown